WQUB (90.3 FM) is a 28,000 watt effective radiated power radio station in Quincy, Illinois, in western Illinois along the Mississippi River. This station provides primary coverage for nine counties in the western Illinois and northeastern Missouri region. It is owned by the University of Missouri St. Louis and serves as a semi-satellite of KWMU in St. Louis.

History
WQUB began in 1948 as WWQC, a carrier current on the campus of Quincy University, then known as Quincy College.  In 1974, the college was granted a full license for a 10-watt station which went on the air in 1979.  Its coverage area was effectively limited to the area around Francis Hall on  campus.  In 1983, power was boosted to 100 watts, enough to cover the campus.  The response was strong enough that the school began an effort to upgrade the station, culminating in becoming a full NPR member in 1988, not long after the school won university status.  Power was also increased to 10,000 watts.  The station increased its power to the current 28,000 watts in 2000.

However, the station had never attracted much community support.  At one point, listener support only accounted for 10 percent of its operating costs—a very low number even for such a small market.  In 2009, Quincy University transferred operational control of the station to area NBC affiliate WGEM-TV and laid off two staff members.  Even with these measures, Quincy University was finding it difficult to sustain the station in the economic climate, and in the spring of 2012 decided to get out of broadcasting and redirect more of its resources into academics.  In hopes of preserving public radio in the Tri-State, it sold WQUB to UMSL in May 2012.  The sale officially closed on July 26, 2012.

Before the sale, WQUB aired a mix of NPR news and talk, classical music, alternative music and jazz.  Since the sale, WQUB has aired the same programming as KWMU, with local inserts.

References

External links
Quincy Public Radio
Last version of WQUB Website

NPR member stations
Radio stations established in 1974
QUB